Calyptra gruesa is a moth of the  family Erebidae. It has been found in China.

References

Calpinae
Moths of Japan
Moths described in 1950